"Go Where You Wanna Go" is a 1965 song written by John Phillips.  It was originally recorded by the Mamas & the Papas on their LP If You Can Believe Your Eyes and Ears and given limited release as a single.  However, the record was withdrawn, and its A-side was reassigned to "California Dreamin'".  "Go Where You Wanna Go" later became a hit for the 5th Dimension.

P.F. Sloan played guitar on the song. John Phillips said that he wrote it about Michelle Phillips's affair with Russ Titelman, a songwriter and record producer.

The Fifth Dimension version

The 5th Dimension recorded "Go Where You Wanna Go" for their debut studio album in 1967, Up, Up and Away. The song was the group's first single to chart (after their first Soul City release, "Train Keep On Movin'", was unsuccessful), reaching number 16 on the U.S. Billboard Hot 100. It also did well in Canada.  It is among the group's 10 biggest hits.

Producer Johnny Rivers suggested the group record the song. According to Marilyn McCoo, "the record company wasn't going to release it as a single, but we put our whole thing into it, released it and it was a hit."

Chart performance

References

External links
 "Go Where You Wanna Go" at SongFacts
  (Mamas & Papas)
  (5th Dimension)

1965 songs
1965 debut singles
1967 singles
The Mamas and the Papas songs
The 5th Dimension songs
Dunhill Records singles
Songs written by John Phillips (musician)
Song recordings produced by Lou Adler